FBI is the Federal Bureau of Investigation of the United States.

FBI may also refer to:

Music
F.B.I. (album), a 1996 song and album by The Dayton Family
"F.B.I." (instrumental), a 1961 single by The Shadows
FBi Radio, a community radio station based in Sydney, Australia

Television
Fully Booked Interactive, a 2000 British children's TV show – a reformat of the series Fully Booked
The F.B.I. (TV series), a 1965–1974 television series based in part on actual FBI cases
FBI (franchise)
FBI (TV series), the television series produced by Dick Wolf, debuted in the 2018–2019 season
FBI: Most Wanted, a spin-off of the above
FBI: International, a spin-off of the above

Organisations
Federation of British Industries, merged into Confederation of British Industry in 1965
Flying Buffalo, Inc., a game publisher based in the Arizona, US
Furniture Brands International, a former Clayton, Missouri, US-based furniture company
Full Blooded Italians, a professional wrestling stable

Science
The Fauna of British India, a series of scientific books published by the British government in India (1890–1947)
FBI mnemonics, for describing directions in magnetic fields
FBI transform (Fourier-Bros-Iaglonitzer transform), a concept in mathematics

See also
The FBI Story, a 1959 film about the Federal Bureau of Investigation
FBI MoneyPak Ransomware, a ransomware virus that claims to be from the FBI